The 2013–14 Florida Atlantic Owls men's basketball team represented Florida Atlantic University during the 2013–14 NCAA Division I men's basketball season. The Owls, led by sixth year head coach Mike Jarvis, played their home games at the FAU Arena, and were first year members of Conference USA. They finished the season 10–22, 5–11 in C-USA play to finish in a tie for twelfth place. They lost in the first round of the C-USA tournament to Marshall.

Roster

Schedule

|-
!colspan=9 style="background:#003366; color:#CE2029;"| Regular season

|-
!colspan=9 style="background:#003366; color:#CE2029;"| 2014 Conference USA tournament

References

Florida Atlantic Owls men's basketball seasons
Florida Atlantic